Susan Jeptooo Kipsang (born 7 March 1987) is a French long distance runner.

Born near Eldoret, Kenya, she runs in the marathon and half marathon, 5,000m, 10,000m, and cross-country.

In 2008, she put her career on hiatus due to pregnancy. In June 2009, she moved to Lyon in France along with her husband Jakub, and in 2011 began racing again with the Lyon Athletics Club after the births of Kelvin in 2008, then of Mercy in 2011. In 2019 she gained French nationality.

She ran the World Athletics Half Marathon Championships, in Gdynia in 2020, and finished runner up at the French national championships in the 10,000m.
 
On 10 January 2021 she achieved the Olympic qualifying standard in the marathon in Marrakech, running 2:28:48 seconds. She was subsequently named in the French team for the marathon in the delayed 2020 Tokyo Olympics.

References

1987 births
Living people
French female long-distance runners
French female marathon runners
Kenyan female long-distance runners
Kenyan female marathon runners
Black French sportspeople
Kenyan emigrants to France
Naturalized citizens of France
French people of Kenyan descent
French sportspeople of African descent
Athletes (track and field) at the 2020 Summer Olympics
Olympic athletes of France
People from Uasin Gishu County
21st-century French women